The Upjohn Company was a pharmaceutical manufacturing firm founded in 1886 in Hastings, Michigan, by Dr. William E. Upjohn who was an 1875 graduate of the University of Michigan medical school. The company was originally formed to make friable pills, which were specifically designed to be easily digested. They could be "reduced to a powder under the thumb", a strong marketing argument at the time.

History

Upjohn developed a process for the large scale production of cortisone. The oxygen atom at the 11 position in this steroid is an absolute requirement for biological activity. There are however no known natural sources for starting materials that contain that feature. The only method for preparing this drug prior to 1952 was a lengthy synthesis starting from cholic acid isolated from bile. In 1952, two Upjohn biochemists, Dury Peterson and Herb Murray announced that they were able to introduce this crucial oxygen atom by fermentation of the steroid progesterone with a common  mold of the genus Rhizopus. Over the next several years a group of chemists headed by John Hogg developed a process for preparing cortisone from the soybean sterol stigmasterol. The microbiological oxygenation is a key step in this process.

Subsequently, Upjohn together with Schering biochemically converted cortisone into the more potent steroid prednisone by a bacterial fermentation. In chemical research, the company is known for the development of the Upjohn dihydroxylation by V. VanRheenen, R. C. Kelly, and D. Y. Cha in 1976. Upjohn's best known drugs before the acquisition by Pfizer were Xanax, Halcion, Motrin, Lincocin, and Rogaine.

In 1995, Upjohn merged with Pharmacia AB to form Pharmacia & Upjohn; the company was owned by Pfizer from 2002 until 2020.

In 2015, Pfizer resurrected the Upjohn name for a division which manufactures and licenses drugs for which patents have expired; as of 2019, it planned to divest itself of this business in 2020. 

In July 2019, Pfizer announced plans to merge Upjohn with Mylan, with the new company to be known as Viatris. The merger was expected to close in the first half of 2020, but was delayed due to the COVID-19 pandemic. The merger was completed in November 2020 and the new company was named Viatris.

See also
W. E. Upjohn Institute for Employment Research

References
 

 Upjohn Co. v. United States (449 U.S. 383) (1981)

External links 
 Memories of The Upjohn Company
  http://www.michmarkers.com/startup.asp?startpage=S0582.htm

1886 establishments in Michigan
1995 disestablishments in Michigan
1995 mergers and acquisitions
Companies based in Kalamazoo, Michigan
Pharmaceutical companies established in 1886
Pharmaceutical companies disestablished in 1995
Defunct pharmaceutical companies of the United States
Pfizer
Life sciences industry